The tort of breach of confidence is, in United States law, a common law tort that protects private information that is conveyed in confidence. A claim for breach of confidence typically requires the information to be of a confidential nature, which was communicated in confidence and was disclosed to the detriment of the claimant.

Establishing a breach of confidentiality depends on proving the existence and breach of a duty of confidentiality. Courts in the US look at the nature of the relationship between the parties. Most commonly, breach of confidentiality applies to the patient-physician relationship but it can also apply to relationships involving banks, hospitals, and insurance companies and many others.

There is no tort of breach of confidence in other common law jurisdictions such as the United Kingdom or Australia, however, there is an equitable doctrine of breach of confidence.

See also
 Abuse of information
 Misuse of private information
 Breach of confidence in English law
 United States free speech exceptions

References

External links
 Breach of confidence in the UK
 Breach of confidence in Canada
 Privacy's Other Path: Recovering The Law Of Confidentiality, Neil M Richards, Washington University School of Law; Daniel J. Solove, George Washington University Law School

Tort law